My Worlds: The Collection is the first compilation album released by Canadian singer Justin Bieber. As the international alternative to the Walmart and Sam's Club exclusive My Worlds Acoustic (2010), My Worlds: The Collection was released in numerous European countries on November 19, 2010. The album consists of two discs; the first is a slightly altered version of My Worlds Acoustic, and the second is My Worlds, a compilation itself made up of Bieber's first EP My World (2009) and his first studio album, My World 2.0 (2010). In addition, the compilation also features a new song, an inspirational ballad entitled "Pray" (which served as the project's only single), an acoustic version of Bieber's collaboration with Jaden Smith, "Never Say Never", and remixes of his single "Somebody to Love". The new versions of the songs were produced by Bieber's music director, Dan Kanter, his vocal producer Kuk Harrell, and also record producer Rob Wells. While most professional reviewers complimented the set, several thought that its release was unneeded.  The album charted moderately in Europe, reaching the top half of several countries' album charts.

Background 
The first disc includes songs from My Worlds Acoustic, which features acoustic version of songs from Bieber's debut extended play, My World, and his first studio album, My World 2.0. Bieber spoke with MTV News and he wanted to record the acoustic songs for the "haters" who say he cannot sing and saying his voice was auto-tuned, and that "stripping it down and having it kind of really mellow and being able to hear my voice" was his purpose. The singer said he wanted to do the acoustic set because the production sometimes "drowns out your voice" and "takes away from the singer, over the synths and everything." In addition to the acoustic tracks, the first disc also contains the Usher-featuring and J-Stax remixes to "Somebody to Love", the single version of "Never Say Never", featuring Jaden Smith, as well as a new song, an inspirational ballad entitled, "Pray". The second disc features songs that were present on My Worlds, a package of My World and My World 2.0, which was released instead of or in conjunction with My World 2.0 in select countries.

According to Bieber, "Pray" is a gift to his fans. The song's arrangement is set to reflect Bieber's music before he was discovered, but also includes instrumentation from a string quartet, congas, and a cajon drum, the latter to represent Bieber's worldly travels, specifically to Africa. While Bieber was being interviewed by Ryan Seacrest on his radio show, Bieber talked about the song's initial writing stating the song was influenced by Michael Jackson, and he thought of Jackson's "Man in the Mirror" when writing the song. Vocally, Bieber's vocals are sung in a lower key compared to previous singles. Bieber plays guitar on the acoustic versions, along with his guitarist and musical director Dan Kanter. The acoustic versions of the songs were produced by Kanter, Bieber's vocal producer Kuk Harrell, and also producer Rob Wells.

The album was released on November 19, 2010. "Pray" was released as the album's first and only single on in select countries on December 3, 2010. It charted moderately, reaching number sixty-three in Austria, fifty-one in Germany, and appeared on the Tip charts in Belgium.

Critical reception 
The compilation received mixed reviews from critics. Andy Kellman of Allmusic gave the album four out of five stars. Although Lucy Jones of The Daily Telegraph said the album seemed as something else to be "cashed in on", she called the collaborations "perfectly polished", and gave the album four out of five stars. Hermonie Hoby of The Guardian said that "regifting" following his past two releases seemed unnecessary, but noted that "the billion or so Beliebers" wouldn't feel "churlish."

Commercial performance 
Due to its limited release in European countries, the album was only eligible to chart in those territories. In Denmark, on the Danish Albums Chart, My Worlds: The Collection debuted at number twenty-six. Six weeks later, on the week labeled January 4, 2011, the album peaked at number thirteen on the chart, and it spent a total of fifteen weeks on chart. My Worlds: The Collection debuted at number forty-five on the Swedish Albums Chart, and six weeks later peaked at number thirty. On the Dutch Albums Chart, the album debuted at number forty-one, and peaked at number twenty-six the next week. It spent a total of sixteen weeks on the chart.

On the Finnish Albums Chart the album debuted at number forty-nine, and fell off the chart the next week. However, the week of January 1, 2011, the album re-entered the chart at number forty-seven, and peaked at number thirty-six the next week. The album debuted and peaked at forty-three on the Greek Albums Chart, spending a week on the chart.

Track listing 

Sample credits
"Love Me" contains an interpolation of "Lovefool" (1996), performed by Swedish band The Cardigans.

Personnel 
Adapted from My Worlds: The Collection liner notes.

Personnel
Justin Bieber – vocals
The Jackie Boyz – background vocals
Taylor Graves – background vocals
Bonnie McKee – background vocals
Dwight Reynolds – keyboards
Frédéric Yonnet – harmonica

Production

Antonio "L.A." Reid – executive producer
Arden Altino – producer
Nasri Atweh – producer
Warren Babson – engineer
Matt Beckley – editing
Benny Blanco – producer
Scooter Braun – executive producer
James Bunton – producer
Lashaunda "Babygirl" Carr – producer
Corron Cole – producer
Bryan Michael Cox – producer
Tom Coyne – mastering
Glenn Schick – mastering
Jerry Duplessis – producer
Dernst Emile II – producer
Blake Eiseman – recording
Jaycen Joshua-Fowler mixing
Justin Franks – producer
Serban Ghenea – mixing
Christy Hall – production assistant
Sean Hamilton – producer
Kuk Harrell – vocal producer, producer
Christopher Hicks – producer
Melvin Hough – producer
Dan Kanter – producer
Phillip Lynah Jr. – engineer
Erik Madrid – mixing Assistant
Glen Marchese – mixing
Manny Marroquin – mixing
Ezekiel Lewis – producer
Giancarlo Lino – mixing assistant
Adam Messinger – producer
Balewa Muhammad – producer
Terius Nash – producer
Luis Navarro – assistant engineer
Waynne Nugent – producer
Dave Pensado – mixing
Jeremy Reeves – producer
Kevin Risto – producer
Ray Romulus –  producer
Chris "Tek" O'Ryan – production engineer
Greg Ogan – engineer
Christian Plata – mixing assistant
Kevin Porter – recording assistant
Kelly Sheehan – Engineer
Hyuk Shin – producer
Tricky Stewart –  producer
Brian "B-Luv" Thomas – engineer
Sam Thomas – engineer
Pat Thrall – engineer
Dapo Torimiro – producer
Sergio "Sergical" Tsai – engineer
Rob Wells – producer
Andrew Wuepper – engineer
Jonathan Yip – producer

Charts

Weekly charts

Year-end charts

Certifications

References

2010 compilation albums
Island Records albums
Justin Bieber albums
Albums produced by Kuk Harrell